Lou Yixiao (born 27 December 1988), also known as Loura Lou, is a Chinese actress and singer.

Lou is noted for playing Hu Yifei in the hit sitcom television series iPartment, which enjoyed the highest ratings in China when it was broadcast.

Biography

Early life
Lou was born in Ganjingzi District of Dalian, Liaoning on December 27, 1988, the daughter of a policeman and policewoman. She graduated from Shanghai Theatre Academy, majoring in acting.

Acting career
In 2009, Lou starred in the sitcom television series iPartment, alongside Eric Wang, Deng Jiajia, Michael Chen, Sean Sun, Kimi Li, Jean Lee and Vanessa Zhao, the series was one of the most watched ones in mainland China in that year. Lou also filmed in a number of successful sequels to iPartment.

In 2014, Lou starred as Princess Jianning in the wuxia television series The Deer and the Cauldron, which adapted from Jin Yong's wuxia novel of the same title.

Filmography

Film

Television series

Discography

Singles

Awards and nominations

References

External links
 
  
  
 Lou Yixiao Douban 
 Lou Yixiao Mtime  

1988 births
Living people
21st-century Chinese actresses
21st-century Chinese women singers
Actresses from Dalian
Chinese film actresses
Chinese Mandopop singers
Chinese television actresses
Shanghai Theatre Academy alumni